Criddle is a surname. Notable people with the surname include:

Deborah Criddle (born 1966), British Paralympic equestrian
Mary Ann Criddle (1805–1880), English painter
Murray Criddle (born 1943), Australian politician
Norman Criddle (1875–1933), English-Canadian entomologist

See also
Blaney–Criddle equation